Henry George Williams (born 24 February 1929 in Salford, Lancashire, England), was an English footballer who played as an inside forward in the Football League between 1951 and 1955. He made 21 appearances, mostly for his final league club, Swindon Town.

References

External links

1929 births
Living people
English footballers
Footballers from Salford
Manchester United F.C. players
Swindon Town F.C. players
Witton Albion F.C. players
West Ham United F.C. players
Bury F.C. players
Rhyl F.C. players
English Football League players
Association football forwards